This is a list of Hungarian football transfers for the 2014 summer transfer window by club. Only transfers of clubs in the OTP Bank Liga will be included.

The summer transfer window opened on 1 June 2014, although a few transfers may have taken place prior to that date. The window closed at midnight on 31 August 2014. Players without a club may join one at any time, either during or in between transfer windows.

OTP Bank Liga

Budapest Honvéd

In:

Out:

Debrecen

In:

Out:

Diósgyőr

In:

Out:

Dunaújváros

In:

Out:

Ferencváros

In:

Out:

Győr

In:

Out:

Kecskemét

In:

Out:

MTK

In:

Out:

Nyíregyháza

In:

Out:

Paks

In:

Out:

Pápa

In:

Out:

Pécs

In:

Out:

Puskás

In:

Out:

Szombathely

In:

Out:

Újpest

In:

Out:

Videoton

In:

Out:

References

External links

Hungarian
Transfers summer
2014